Chuang Chia-jung and Darija Jurak were the defending champions, but chose not to participate together. Chuang played alongside Zheng Saisai, but lost in the first round to Gabriela Dabrowski and Jeļena Ostapenko. Jurak teamed up with Anastasia Rodionova, but lost in the second round to Dabrowski and Ostapenko.

Ekaterina Makarova and Elena Vesnina won the title, defeating Andrea Hlaváčková and Peng Shuai in the final, 6–2, 4–6, [10–7].

Seeds
The first four seeds received a bye into the second round.

Draw

Finals

Top half

Bottom half

References
Main Draw

Womens Doubles
2017 WTA Tour